Harvey Island is an island about 1 km east of Cape Grenville in the Great Barrier Reef Marine Park Queensland, Australia, in Temple Bay about 200 km north-east of Kutini-Payamu National Park and Lockhart River on  Cape York Peninsula. It is around 7 hectares or 0.07 square km in size.

This island is part of Home Islands.

References

Islands on the Great Barrier Reef
Uninhabited islands of Australia
Islands of Far North Queensland
Great Barrier Reef Marine Park